The Norman Kay Platinum Pairs national bridge championship is held at the spring American Contract Bridge League (ACBL) North American Bridge Championship (NABC).

The Norman Kay Platinum Pairs is a six-session open-pairs event with two qualifying, two semi-final, and two final sessions.
It is restricted to those players who have earned 50 platinum masterpoints over the three calendar years prior, earned at least 200 platinum points lifetime, or earned the rank of Platinum Life Master or Grand Life Master.

History

The Platinum Pairs were approved by the ACBL Board of Directors in 2008 to start in 2010. In 2011, the Board of Directors renamed the Platinum Pairs the Norman Kay Platinum Pairs.

Its introduction in 2010 gives the three annual NABC meets each one three-day pairs tournament open to all players without regard to age, sex, nationality, or membership. The Platinum Pairs shares the Spring NABC with the North American Pairs, restricted to ACBL members who qualify in one of its 25 Districts, many of which require qualification in local Units. It also requires past achievement greater than that required by the summer Von Zedtwitz Life Master Pairs or the fall Edgar Kaplan Blue Ribbon Pairs (but all are within reach for leading players from overseas who attend a few American meets).

Winners

In the first six renditions to 2015, Thomas Bessis was runner-up twice and winner once. Bessis and Cedric Lorenzini, both of France, were second in 2014 and first in 2015.

See also
Edgar Kaplan Blue Ribbon Pairs, or simply Blue Ribbons Pairs 
Von Zedtwitz Life Master Pairs, or simply Life Masters Pairs

References

External links

 NABC Winners: Norman Kay Platinum Pairs – official database view, all years

North American Bridge Championships